Tachytrechus auratus is a species of long-legged fly in the family Dolichopodidae.

References

Dolichopodinae
Articles created by Qbugbot
Insects described in 1896
Taxa named by John Merton Aldrich